Cannabis in the United Kingdom is illegal for recreational use and is classified as a Class B drug. In 2004, the United Kingdom made cannabis a Class C drug with less severe penalties, but it was moved back to Class B in 2009. Medical use of cannabis, when prescribed by a registered specialist doctor, was legalised in November 2018.

Cannabis is widely used as an illegal drug in the UK, while other strains lower in THC have been used industrially for over a thousand years for fibre, oil and seeds. Cannabis has been restricted as a drug in the United Kingdom since 1928, though its usage as a recreational drug was limited until the 1960s, when increasing popularity led to stricter 1971 classification.

Despite the fact that cannabis is still illegal in the UK, with limited availability for medical use, the United Kingdom is the world's largest exporter of legal cannabis.

History

Industrial use

The oldest evidence of cannabis in Britain was from some seeds found in a well in York; seeds found at Micklegate were associated with a 10th-century Viking settlement. Since it appears to have been mostly grown around the coastal areas it suggests the main reason for cultivating it was as a source of vegetable fibre which was stronger and more durable than stinging nettle or flax. This makes it ideal for making into cordage, ropes, fishing nets, and canvas.

With hempen ropes being fundamental to the success of the English Navy, King Henry VIII in 1533 mandated that landowners grow allotments of hemp; Elizabeth I later increased those quotas, and the penalties for failing to meet them. As fibre became more available and the growing of hemp became more widespread, people began to find many other uses for the crop. It became a very important part of the British economy. Eventually, demand had expanded to the point that the demand for more fibre was part of the driving force to colonise new lands. Thanks to its hardiness and ease of cultivation, it became an ideal crop to grow in the new British colonies. Moreover, the naval ships built to protect the new colonies and those built to bring the hemp back, also increased demand, as every two years or so much of their two hundred tonnes of ropes and sail cloth had to be renewed.

Use as a drug
Cannabis gained new attention in the Western medical world at the introduction of Irish physician William Brooke O'Shaughnessy, who had studied the drug while working as a medical officer in Bengal with the East India Company, and brought a quantity of cannabis with him on his return to Britain in 1842.

Use of psychoactive cannabis was already prevalent in some of the new territories that Britain added to its empire, including South Asia and Southern Africa. Cannabis as a drug also spread slowly in other parts of the Empire; cannabis was introduced to Jamaica in the 1850s–1860s by indentured servants imported from India during British rule of both nations; many of the terms used in cannabis culture in Jamaica are based on Indian terms, including the term ganja.

Prohibition
Cannabis prohibition began earlier in Britain's colonies than in Britain itself; attempts at criminalising cannabis in British India were made, and mooted, in 1838, 1871, and 1877. In 1894 the British Indian Hemp Drugs Commission judged that "little injury" was caused to society by the use of cannabis. Cannabis was banned in Mauritius in 1840, Singapore in 1870, Jamaica in 1913, East Africa Protectorate in 1914, and in Sierra Leone in 1920. In 1922, South Africa banned cannabis, and appealed to the League of Nations to include cannabis among prohibited drugs in its upcoming convention.

In Britain itself, in 1928 in accordance with the 1925 International Opium Convention, the United Kingdom first prohibited cannabis as a drug, adding cannabis as an addendum to the Dangerous Drugs Act 1920.

Cannabis remained a fringe issue in the British public consciousness through the Interwar years and beyond, associated with society's margins: "coloured seamen of the East End and clubs frequented by Negro theatrical performers". This perception was strained by a 1950 police raid on Club Eleven in Soho which recovered cannabis and cocaine, and led to the arrest of several young white British men. With the changing youth and drug cultures globally, cannabis arrests increased dramatically in the UK: "from 235 in 1960 to 4,683 by the end of the decade, principally involving white middle class youths with no previous convictions". By 1973, marijuana possession convictions in the UK had reached 11,111 annually.

With the passage of the Misuse of Drugs Act 1971, cannabis was listed as a Class B drug. It remained Class B, except for the 2004–2009 period where it was classified as Class C, a lower punishment category, before being moved back to B.

Cultivation
The UK produces cannabis for use as a drug in illegal facilities inside private houses or apartments. The production is so high that the UK is an exporter of cannabis. After cannabis as a drug was rescheduled as Class B in 2008 (see below), more people started reporting on their suspicions of illegal operations and in 2009-2010 almost 7000 illegal facilities were found by police in one year. It has been reported that sometimes Vietnamese teenagers are trafficked to the United Kingdom and forced to work in these facilities. When police raid them, trafficked victims are typically sent to prison. Sometimes they are sent home.

Usage

Recreational drug
Cannabis is widely used throughout the United Kingdom, by people of all ages and from all socio-economic backgrounds. In 2017, 7.2% of 16 to 59-year-olds reported using cannabis in the last year, making it the most commonly used illegal drug in the United Kingdom. The European drug report 2017 found that 29.4% of those aged 15–64 had used cannabis at least once. This compares with France who has some of the strongest drug laws in Europe with 40.9% and Portugal which views drug taking as a medical issue and therefore has far more relaxed laws at 9.4%

Cannabis is at times linked to young people beginning to smoke tobacco as cannabis is often smoked with tobacco in the United Kingdom, unlike in many other parts of the world. As well as the use of tobacco when smoking cannabis, as a spliff, many people in Britain use a "roach card" (card or similar material rolled into a cylinder to serve as a rudimentary filter / structural support). As the option of vaporisation becomes more readily available, and as the market for hashish is replaced by herbal cannabis grown in the UK which can be smoked pure in a joint, this association of mixing cannabis with tobacco is becoming weaker. The higher relative price of cannabis compared to the rest of the world remains the most likely explanation for the mixing of cannabis with tobacco (although many users do this purely to ensure the "joint" smokes correctly, and to prevent it from going out).

Mental health concerns
In February 2015, a team of researchers at the Institute Of Psychiatry, King's College London, led by Dr. Marta Di Forti, found that use of high potency cannabis known as skunk increased the risk of psychosis by three times, compared to non-use. The study of 780 people also found the risk of psychosis was five times higher for those who used cannabis every day.

Industrial cannabis 
Since 1993, the Home Office has been granting licences for the purposes of cultivating and processing cannabis. The UK government now provides free business advice and support services for growers and processors of cannabis for fibre. They can also issue licences for importing fibre in the form of hemp from abroad. The Department for Environment, Food and Rural Affairs (DEFRA) provides help and advice with obtaining financial assistance via the Single Payment Scheme. In England further funding may be available from Rural Development Programme for England.

Animal feed
Mice, rats and fowl are all known to like cannabis seed, and it is a favoured food amongst some British pigeon fanciers. The linnet's fondness of the cannabis seed has earned it the Latin species name of cannabina. Cannabis seed is too expensive to be used as general feed stock, but once the oil has been pressed out the remaining seed cake is still nutritious.

The plant itself has not been used as fodder as too much makes animals sicken, and due to its unpleasant taste they will not eat it unless there is no other food available. Hemp hurd, also called shives, is the soft core of the cannabis plant which remains after the fibres are removed, and provides good animal bedding which can absorb more moisture than either straw or wood shavings.

Boiled cannabis seed is frequently used by British sport fishermen.

Legal status

Recreational use
Cannabis is illegal to possess, grow, distribute or sell in the UK. It is a Class B drug, with penalties for unlicenced dealing, unlicenced production and unlicenced trafficking of up to 14 years in prison, an unlimited fine, or both. The maximum penalty for possession of cannabis is five years in prison and an unlimited fine. A "Cannabis warning" can be issued for small amounts of cannabis (generally less than 1 ounce of herbal cannabis, or a slightly higher quantity of hashish) if it is found to be for personal use. This entails the police keeping a record, albeit one which carries no fine and does not show up on standard DBS Check.

Cannabis has remained a Class B drug since the 1971 Misuse of Drugs Act, except for a period from 2004 to 2009 during which it was classified as Class C, a lower punishment category. The 2004 reclassification (originally announced in 2001) removed the threat of arrest for possession of small amounts, for the purpose of allowing police to focus on harder drugs and violent crime. In May 2008, under the leadership of Prime Minister Gordon Brown, it was announced that cannabis would be moved back to Schedule B, against the recommendations of the Advisory Council on the Misuse of Drugs.

Enforcement
In the survey-year ending March 2014, possession of cannabis offences accounted for 67% of all police recorded drug offences in the UK.

In 2015, County Durham police announced that they will no longer be targeting people who grow cannabis for personal consumption unless they are being "blatant". Derbyshire, Dorset and Surrey police announced that they will also be implementing similar schemes. The move is in response to significant budget cuts, which means police forces are having to prioritise more pressing areas.

According to figures obtained through a Freedom of Information request, there are large differences by county regarding how many cases actually result in an offender being charged. In 2016, Hampshire police had the most charges at 65%, while Cambridge had the lowest proportion of charges at only 14%.

Medical use
Medical use of cannabis was legalised in the UK on 1 November 2018, after the cases of two epileptic children who benefited from using cannabis brought increased public attention to the issue. The children (Billy Caldwell, 12, and Alfie Dingley, 6) both experienced significant improvement in their conditions after they began using cannabis, but were initially not allowed to continue their treatment under UK law. This led to increased public outcry, particularly in the case of Billy Caldwell who was hospitalised with life-threatening seizures after his medication was confiscated by authorities.

On 20 June 2018, then Health Secretary Jeremy Hunt announced his support for the medical use of cannabis and that a review would be undertaken to study changes to the law. On 26 July 2018, Home Secretary Sajid Javid announced that cannabis products would be made legal for patients with an "exceptional clinical need", and that cannabis would be moved from a Schedule I classification to Schedule II. On 11 October, the new provisions were officially presented and accepted in the House and the policy came into effect on 1 November 2018.

A licence is available from the home office to import prescribed medicinal cannabis. The first private, stand-alone CQC registered cannabis clinic was opened by Sapphire medical in December 2019, since then a number of private clinics have opened across the UK. The first UK MHRA approved medical cannabis study was approved by REC (the MHRA ethics committee) in November 2021 with the study title of "CANPAIN feasibility study: evaluating the feasibility of undertaking a pragmatic real world trial investigating CBMP in chronic pain patients" with IRAS project ID 304548 of which will be provided by LVL Health in the UK. It is now possible to obtain a private prescription for medical cannabis, providing a patient can show through medical records they have a qualifying condition.

Treatment must be initiated by a specialist consultant and may be continued under sharedcare by a GP or non-medical prescriber. NHS guidance states that medical cannabis should only be prescribed when there is clear published evidence of its benefit and other treatment options have been exhausted.

Sativex is an approved cannabis-derived medicine and is indicated for the treatment of spasticity caused by multiple sclerosis and chemotherapy-induced nausea and vomiting. Nabilone is another cannabinoid drug that has been approved by the Medicines and Healthcare products Regulatory Agency (MHRA), but is a synthetic form of THC and not naturally derived from the plant. Nabilone can be prescribed to treat nausea and vomiting caused by cytotoxic chemotherapy.

Cannabidiol (CBD) oil is legal for use and sale in the UK without a prescription, as long as when it is sold to the public it is not sold as medicine. The CBD drug Epidiolex is approved for use in the EU.

On 31 October 2020, it was reported that the NHS has been repeatedly refusing to fund medical cannabis for children with severe epilepsy. It was reported that at least twenty families are paying for private prescriptions after not being provided by the NHS. One family reported paying £2,000 a month for their 11-year-old daughter, who had been having up to 300 seizures a day. Doctors put her into an induced coma and transported her to intensive care. After an anonymous donation was given to one of the child's parents of £2,500, the parent bought cannabis oil for their child, who after taking it was allowed home within two days. The Department of Health and Social Care said more research is needed before it can routinely prescribe cannabis-based medicines. Peter Carroll of the campaign group End Our Pain said there are dozens more families in a similar position or unable to pay for the drugs at all.

Overseas territories

Medical use of cannabis was legalised following a ruling by the Supreme Court of Bermuda in 2016.

In 2016, the governor of the British Overseas Territory of the Cayman Islands approved a change to the Misuse of Drugs Law to allow the importation and use of CBD oil for medical purposes.

Advocacy for law reform
Various organisations have been setup in the UK to seek regulatory and/or policy change around cannabis and/or cannabis-based products.

 Cannabis Industry Council
 CLEAR (Cannabis Law Reform)
 Drug Equality Alliance (DEA)
 NORML UK (Cannabis legislation reform)
 Transform Drug Policy Foundation
 UKCSC – United Kingdom Cannabis Social Club

The former Prime Minister, David Cameron, when serving in opposition, sat on the Select Committee on Home Affairs and voted to call on the Government to "initiate a discussion" within the UN about "alternative ways—including the possibility of legalisation and regulation—to tackle the global drugs dilemma".

In June 2010, it was revealed that the Home Office had been avoiding complying with the FOI request "to avoid a focus on the gaps in the evidence base" that its current drug policy had.

In 2011, the Global Commission on Drug Policy backed by Richard Branson and Judi Dench called for a review. The Home Office response on behalf of the Prime Minister was: "We have no intention of liberalising our drugs laws. Drugs are illegal because they are harmful—they destroy lives and cause untold misery to families and communities".

In 2012, a panel of MPs, as well as deputy prime-minister Nick Clegg, recommended that drug policy be reformed, as the current policy does not adequately deal with the problem. David Cameron rejected the idea, conflicting with comments he made in 2005 while competing for Conservative Party Leadership.

In 2015, James Richard Owen, an economics student at Aberystwyth University, started a petition on the UK Government's official petitions website calling for the legalisation of the cultivation, sale and use of cannabis;  it had gathered 218,995 signatures, far in excess of the 100,000 needed for it to be considered for debate in Parliament. Parliament debated this petition on 12 October 2015.

A study published in March 2016 said that legalising cannabis in the UK would raise up to one billion pounds in tax a year and reduce the harm done to users and society. The study was carried out by a panel of experts including scientists, academics and police chiefs. It recommended legalising cannabis for over 18s, which could legally be purchased from licensed single-purpose stores. It also recommended that home-cultivation of cannabis should be legal for personal use and small-scale licensed cannabis social clubs should be legally allowed to be established. Under its recommendations,  the price, potency and packaging of all sold cannabis would be controlled by the Government with a new regulator established to oversee the market, possibly modelled on Ofgem and Ofwat and drug production and sales would be taxed, raising, the panel claims, between £500m and £1bn a year. Estimates by other reports have placed the value of a legalised cannabis market in the UK at between £1 billion to £3.5 billion and have said that it could cut costs across the justice system and become a job creator.

In March 2016, the Liberal Democrats became the first major political party in the UK to support the legalisation of cannabis. The Green Party also support a legal and regulated cannabis market.

In early 2018, the Institute of Economic Affairs (IEA) published a report looking at the size of the UK cannabis market and the potential implications of legalisation. The report concluded that the current UK cannabis black market is worth over £2.5bn and cannabis tax yields could be between £204 million and £571 million. The recommendation from the IEA is that if cannabis is legalised, the duty rate should not be too high, as high tax would make retail prices less competitive and could prevent significant shrinkage of the black market. Advocates of legalisation have stated that the legalisation of cannabis would take away sales and control from criminal gangs – who also push hard drugs – in favour legitimate and regulated businesses. Legalisation has also been advocated because it would ensure the drug meets acceptable standards and is pure, while also limiting the access of young people via a minimum age for purchase, possession and use.

The Head of Lifestyle Economics at the IEA described legalisation of cannabis as a "win-win-win", noting: "criminals lose a lucrative industry, consumers get a better, safer and cheaper product and the burden on the general taxpayer is reduced".

Public opinion 

A report conducted between 24 February and 14 March 2022 by Hanway and Savanta ComRes interviewed a nationally representative sample of 9,043 adults aged over 18 in several European countries, including the UK, regarding cannabis legalisation. 55% of UK respondents reported to be in favour of legal and regulated cannabis sales to over-18s, while 27% of UK respondents reported to be opposed and 16% stated neither support nor oppose. Of the 8 European countries surveyed in France, Germany, Italy, Spain, Netherlands, Portugal, Switzerland, and the UK, 55% overall reported to be in favour of legal and regulated cannabis sales to over-18s.

See also

 Adult lifetime cannabis use by country
 Annual cannabis use by country
 Drugs controlled by the UK Misuse of Drugs Act
 Legality of cannabis
 List of British politicians who have acknowledged cannabis use
  List of cannabis rights leaders from the UK

References

Further reading

External links 
‘Legalise It, Don’t Criticise It’ - Should Cannabis Be Legalised? The Huffington Post (UK edition). Published 4 July 2013. Retrieved 13 January 2017.
 Parliamentary report set to recommend legalising medicinal cannabis. ITV. Published 12 September 2016. Retrieved 5 January 2017. 
 Cannabis legalisation 'could raise £1bn a year for UK'. BBC NEWS. Published 21 November 2016. Retrieved 5 January 2017.
 Legalisation of cannabis 'only solution to crime and addiction problems'. The Guardian. Published 21 November 2016. Retrieved 5 January 2017.
 MPs call for legalisation of cannabis amid warning UK is falling behind in its drug policies. The Independent. Published 21 November 2016. Retrieved 5 January 2017.

 
Cannabis law reform in the United Kingdom